Mačkovac can refer to several places in Croatia, Bosnia and Herzegovina and Serbia:

Serbia
Mačkovac (Kruševac), village in the Kruševac municipality
Mačkovac, Kuršumlija, village in the Kuršumlija municipality

Bosnia and Herzegovina
Mačkovac (Gradiška), village in the Gradiška municipality
Mačkovac, Gornji Vakuf-Uskoplje, village in the Gornji Vakuf-Uskoplje municipality
Mačkovac, Lopare, village in the Lopare municipality

Croatia
Mačkovac, Brod-Posavina County, village in the Vrbje municipality
Mačkovac, Virovitica-Podravina County, village in the Voćin municipality

See also
Mačkovec (disambiguation)